Blankenburg  may refer to:

Places
 Blankenburg am Harz, a German town in the district of Harz, Saxony-Anhalt
 Blankenburg Castle (Harz), the castle in Blankenburg am Harz (see above)
 Bad Blankenburg, a German town in the Saalfeld-Rudolstadt district of Thuringia
 Blankenburg, Unstrut-Hainich-Kreis, a German municipality in the Unstrut Hainich district of Thuringia
 Blankenburg (Berlin), an area in the borough of Pankow in Berlin
 County of Blankenburg, a former state of the Holy Roman Empire
Blankenburg (Verwaltungsgemeinschaft)

Other uses
 Blankenburg (surname)

See also
Blankenberg (disambiguation)
Blankenberge, Belgian town